The 1984 Volvo Grand Prix was a professional tennis circuit held that year. It incorporated the four Grand Slam tournaments, the Grand Prix tournaments and two team events (World Team Cup, Davis Cup).

Schedule
The table below shows the 1984 Volvo Grand Prix schedule (a forerunner of the ATP Tour).

Key

January

February

March

April

May

June

July

August

September

October

November

December

January 1985

Grand Prix rankings

*The official ATP year-end rankings were listed from January 2nd, 1985.

List of tournament winners
The list of winners and number of singles titles won, alphabetically by last name:
 Juan Aguilera (2) Aix-en-Provence, Hamburg
 Vijay Amritraj (1) Newport
 Francesco Cancellotti (2) Florence, Palermo
 Dan Cassidy (1) Melbourne
 Jimmy Connors (5) Memphis, La Quinta, Boca West, Los Angeles, Tokyo Indoor
 Marty Davis (1) Honolulu
 Mark Dickson (1) Houston WCT, Toulouse
 Peter Doohan (1) Adelaide
 Stefan Edberg (1) Milan
 John Fritzgerald (1) Sydney Outdoor
 Vitas Gerulaitis (1) Treviso
 Brad Gilbert (2) Columbus, Taiwan
 Andrés Gómez (5) Nice, Rome, Washington, D.C., Indianapolis, Hong Kong
 José Higueras (2) Kitzbühel, Bordeaux
 Anders Järryd (2) Hilversum, Sydney Indoor
 Aaron Krickstein (3) Boston, Tel Aviv, Geneva
 Johan Kriek (2) Bristol, Livingston
 Ramesh Krishnan (1) Metz
 Henri Leconte (1) Stuttgart Outdoor
 Ivan Lendl (3) Luxembourg, French Open, Wembley
 John McEnroe (13) Philadelphia, Richmond WCT, Madrid, Brussels, Queen's Club, Wimbledon, Dallas WCT, Forest Hills WCT, Toronto, US Open, San Francisco, Stockholm, Masters
 Paul McNamee (1) Houston
 Matt Mitchell (1) Melbourne Indoor
 Terry Moor (1) Cleveland
 Joakim Nyström (4) Gstaad, North Conway, Basel, Cologne
 David Pate (1) Tokyo Outdoor
 Libor Pimek (1) Munich
 Danny Saltz (1) Auckland
 Henrik Sundström (3) Bari, Monte Carlo, Båstad
 Eliot Teltscher (2) Brisbane, Johannesburg
 Mats Wilander (3) Cincinnati, Barcelona, Australian Open
 Tim Wilkison (1) Vienna

The following players won their first title in 1984:
 Juan Aguilera Aix-en-Provence
 Francesco Cancellotti Florence
 Dan Cassidy Melbourne
 Mark Dickson Houston WCT
 Peter Doohan Adelaide
 Stefan Edberg Milan
 Matt Mitchell Melbourne Indoor
 Terry Moor Cleveland
 David Pate Tokyo Outdoor
 Libor Pimek Munich
 Danny Saltz Auckland

See also
 1984 World Championship Tennis circuit
 1984 Virginia Slims World Championship Series

References
ATP Archive 1984:Volvo Grand Prix Tournaments Accessed 22/10/2010.
History Mens Professional Tours:Accessed 22/10/2010.

Further reading

 
Grand Prix tennis circuit seasons
Grand Prix